Maylandia or Metriaclima is a genus of haplochromine cichlids endemic to Lake Malawi in East Africa. They belong to the mbuna (rock-dwelling) haplochromines.

Like most Lake Malawi cichlids, exhibit brood care via maternal mouthbrooding. Numerous members of the genus are traded as aquarium fish. They are attractive because they are brightly colored and often very sexually dimorphic; like other cichlids they are not suited for beginners and for most companion tanks.

Name
The name Maylandia, honours the cichlid enthusiast and author about aquaria Hans Joachim Mayland, who died in 2004, was proposed as a subgenus of Pseudotropheus in 1984, naming the long-known but undescribed "Ice Blue Zebra" as the type species.

In 1997 Stauffer et al. described the genus Metriaclima, dismissing the pre-existing Maylandia on the assumption that it lacked a type species and a diagnosis. Two years later Condé and Géry published an analysis and declared Metriaclima to be a junior synonym of Maylandia, and Maylandia hence the valid name of the genus, a view accepted by most ichthyologists.

A few authors, notably Ad Konings, dispute that the original description of Maylandia is sufficient to establish and maintain the genus. They maintain that "Maylandia" is a nomen nudum – literally, a "naked name" that does not validly refer to a group of animals as per the rules of the International Code of Zoological Nomenclature.

In the present article, following FishBase, Catalog of Fishes and the IUCN, the genus name Maylandia is used.

Species
There are currently 30 recognized species in this genus:
 Maylandia aurora (W. E. Burgess, 1976)
 Maylandia barlowi (McKaye & Stauffer, 1986)
 Maylandia benetos (Stauffer, Bowers, Kellogg & McKaye, 1997)
 Maylandia callainos (Stauffer & Hert, 1992) (Cobalt Zebra, Cobalt Blue Mbuna)
 Maylandia chrysomallos (Stauffer, Bowers, Kellogg & McKaye, 1997)
 Maylandia cyneusmarginatus (Stauffer, Bowers, Kellogg & McKaye, 1997)
 Maylandia emmiltos (Stauffer, Bowers, Kellogg & McKaye, 1997)
 Maylandia estherae (Konings, 1995) (Red Zebra Mbuna, Red Zebra, Esther Grant's Zebra)
 Maylandia fainzilberi Staeck, 1976
 Maylandia flavicauda (Li, Konings & Stauffer 2016)
 Maylandia flavifemina (Konings & Stauffer, 2006)
 Maylandia glaucos (Ciccotta, Konings & Stauffer, 2011)
 Maylandia greshakei (M. K. Meyer & W. Förster, 1984) (William's Mbuna, Ice Blue Zebra Mbuna, Ice Blue Zebra)
 Maylandia hajomaylandi (M. K. Meyer & Schartl, 1984)
 Maylandia heteropicta Staeck, 1980
 Maylandia koningsi (Stauffer 2018) 
 Maylandia lanisticola (W. E. Burgess, 1976)
 Maylandia livingstonii (Boulenger, 1899)
 Maylandia lombardoi (W. E. Burgess, 1977) (Kennyi Mbuna, Kenyi Mbuna, Lombardoi Mbuna)
 Maylandia lundoensis (Stauffer, K. E. Black & Konings, 2013)
 Maylandia mbenjii (Stauffer, Bowers, Kellogg & McKaye, 1997)
 Maylandia midomo (Stauffer, K. E. Black & Konings, 2013)
 Maylandia mossambica (Ciccotta, Konings & Stauffer, 2011)
 Maylandia nigrodorsalis (Stauffer, K. E. Black & Konings, 2013)
 Maylandia nkhunguensis (Ciccotta, Konings & Stauffer, 2011)
 Maylandia pambazuko (Stauffer, K. E. Black & Konings, 2013)
 Maylandia phaeos (Stauffer, Bowers, Kellogg & McKaye, 1997)
 Maylandia pulpican (Tawil, 2002)
 Maylandia pyrsonotos (Stauffer, Bowers, Kellogg & McKaye, 1997)
 Maylandia sciasma (Ciccotta, Konings & Stauffer, 2011)
 Maylandia tarakiki (Stauffer, K. E. Black & Konings, 2013)
 Maylandia xanstomachus (Stauffer & Boltz, 1989)
 Maylandia xanthos (Ciccotta, Konings & Stauffer, 2011)
 Maylandia zebra (Boulenger, 1899) (Zebra Mbuna)

Footnotes

References

  (2010): . "Maylandia or Metriaclima – the case for Metriaclima. eggspots no. 4: 39-45.
  (2007): New Metriaclima described. Pract. Fishkeeping. Retrieved 2009-OCT-03.
  (1999): Maylandia Meyer et Foerster, 1984, un nom générique disponible (Teleostei, Perciformes, Cichlidae) [Maylandia Meyer and Foerster, 1984, an available generic name]. Revue Française d'Aquariologie et de Herpetologie 26:(1-2) 21-22.
  [2009]: Maylandia species. Retrieved 2009-OCT-03.
  (2009): 2009 IUCN Red List of Threatened Species. Version 2009.1. Retrieved 2009-SEP-20.
  (1998): Maylandia oder Metriaclima ["Maylandia or Metriaclima"]? Die Aquarien- und Terrarienzeitschrift 51: 813 [in German].
  (2001): Malawi Cichlids in their natural habitat (3rd ed.) Cichlid Press, USA. 
  (2005): Maylandia or Metriaclima, ...again!. Retrieved 2007-MAR-02.
  (2006): Revised diagnosis of Metriaclima (Teleostei: Cichlidae) with description of a new species from Lake Malawi National Park, Africa. Ichthyological Exploration of Freshwaters 17: 233-246. PDF abstract and first page
  (1984): Un nouveau Pseudotropheus du lac Malawi avec des remarques sur le complexe Pseudotropheus-Melanochromis (Pisces, Perciformes, Cichlidae) ["A new Pseudotropheus from Lake Malawi and remarks on the Pseudotropheus-Melanochromis complex"]. Revue Française d'Aquariologie et de Herpetologie 10: 107-112 [in French]. HTML fulltext of genus description.
  (2002): Maylandia, Metriaclima, or Pseudotropheus?. Version of 2002-JAN-07. Retrieved 2009-OCT-03.
  (2003): Validity and availability of Maylandia – The technical details. Version of 2003-JAN-08. Retrieved 2009-OCT-03.
  (2009): Checklist of the Mbuna Species Flock. Version of 2009-APR-24. Retrieved 2009-OCT-03.
  (2009): . "Maylandia or Metriaclima – still a matter of debate?. eggspots no. 2: 5-15.
  (1998): Von Roloffia roloffi und Maylandia hajomaylandi ["On Roloffia roloffi and Maylandia hajomaylandi"]. Die Aquarien- und Terrarienzeitschrift 51: 812-813 [in German].
  (1997): A revision of the blue-black Pseudotropheus zebra (Teleostei: Cichlidae) complex from Lake Malawi, Africa, with a description of a new genus and ten new species. Proceedings of the Academy of Natural Sciences of Philadelphia 148: 189-230. Abstract and first page image

 

Haplochromini
Cichlid genera